Toby Love (born Octavio Rivera; March 20, 1985) is an American singer, rapper and songwriter of Puerto Rican descent. Based on The Bronx, New York, he is best known for being a former member of Aventura before pursuing a solo career, mostly known for their 2002 album We Broke the Rules, later performing a style of bachata music that combines traditional and urban singing and production.

Background
Toby Love was born in The Bronx, New York to Puerto Rican parents, coming from a musical family, he grew up listening to a bunch of different music genres, such as pop, hip-hop, R&B, bachata and merengue. His father Toby Rivera sang with the salsa orchestral group Conjunto Clásico. His mother was later remarried to a Dominican man, which eventually led to Toby Love's exposure around both Dominican and Puerto Rican cultures. He started working with Aventura as a backup vocalist and additional percussionist. His voice was featured in 2 songs, I Believe and Gone in the album We Broke the Rules
beginning a solo career with his 2006 LP, Toby Love, released on Sony Records.  In 2008, he received four nominations to the Billboard Latin Music Awards for songs included in his debut album.  Love won awards for two categories, Tropical Airplay Song of the Year, and Latin Rap / Hip Hop Album of the Year.

Love embarked on his solo career. Living in the same neighborhood as the group, he became close friends with the member "Mikey", who later asked Love to join.

Toby Love is recognized as the artist that made the subgenre of crunkchata popular.  As the result of having recorded half of his debut album in Miami, Love became a fan of crunk music, and incorporated it into his bachata music.

Love produces the majority of the music used in his albums, along with co-producer Eddie Perez.

Personal life
In addition to living in New York, Toby Love also spends his time between homes in Puerto Rico, Dominican Republic, and New Jersey.  Love hopes to begin working as an actor, in addition to his career as a musician.

Discography

Studio albums
Toby Love (Sony BMG, 2006)
Love Is Back (Sony BMG, 2008)
La Voz De La Juventud (Sony Music, 2011)
Amor Total (Top Stop Music, 2013)
Bachata Nation (Elegant Records, 2016)

Compilation albums
Mis Favoritas (Sony Music, 2012)

Singles

Featurings

Tito El Bambino : La Busco
Alexis & Fido - Soy Igual Que Tu
Chosen Few Movement - Grind It Up (featuring Toby Love & Lumidee)
Omega - Tu No Ta Pa Mi (Remix)
Magic Juan - La Otra Noche
Aventura - I Believe (Yo Creo) & Gone
Javi G - Por Qué? (Toby Love y Mikey)
Tony CJ - Mi Primer Amor (Salsa Version)
Fanny Lú - Y Si te Digo (Bachata, 2007)
R.K.M & Ken-Y - Tengo un Amor (2006)

References

External links
Toby Love on Myspace

Aventura (band) members
Living people
Musicians from the Bronx
American bachata musicians
Singers from New York (state)
American musicians of Puerto Rican descent
American male singers
Sony Music Latin artists
Top Stop Music artists
Latin music songwriters
Year of birth missing (living people)
Bachata singers